Associação Atlética Portuguesa, also known as Portuguesa Carioca, Portuguesa do Rio or Portuguesa da Ilha, is a Brazilian professional association football club based in Governador Island, Rio de Janeiro. The team plays in Série D, the fourth tier of the Brazilian football league system, as well as in the Campeonato Carioca, the top tier of the Rio de Janeiro state football league.

History
The club was founded on 17 December 1924, by a group of empty bags businessmen. After travelling to Santos, they played there a football match against a Santos' group of businessmen. The match ended 1–1. After returning to Rio de Janeiro, they decided to found a football club. Portuguesa is named after Associação Atlética Portuguesa Santista, a football club from Santos. Portuguesa has a great memory of when they beat Real Madrid the most famous team of Europe in 1969 by 2–1. One of the most noticed players at that match was Escurinho, who played part of his career for Fluminense and also for Brazil. In 1969, some European teams thought about buying Escurinho, but they had given up because of his age (39 years old).

Roster

First team squad

Stadium

Portuguesa's home stadium is Estádio Luso Brasileiro, built in 1965, with a maximum capacity of 4,697 spectators. Portuguesa's stadium is sometimes used by two first division teams from Rio de Janeiro, Flamengo and Botafogo.

Symbols
The team mascot is a zebra.

Achievements
 Campeonato Carioca Série A2:
 Winners (5): 1939, 1940, 1996, 2000, 2003
 Taça Santos Dumont de 2015
Copa Rio:
 Winners (2): 2000, 2016

External links
Official Site

 
Association football clubs established in 1924
Portuguesa (RJ)
1924 establishments in Brazil